When a Stranger Calls is a 1979 American psychological thriller film written and directed by Fred Walton, co-written by Steve Feke, and starring Charles Durning, Carol Kane, Colleen Dewhurst and Tony Beckley. Its plot follows Jill Johnson, a young woman terrorized by a psychopathic killer while babysitting, the killer's subsequent stalking of another woman, and his return to torment Jill years later and also the detective trying to track him down. Rachel Roberts, Ron O'Neal, Carmen Argenziano, and Rutanya Alda appear in supporting roles. The film derives its story from the classic folk legend of "the babysitter and the man upstairs".

The film was released in the United States on September 28, 1979, by Columbia Pictures. It was commercially successful, grossing $20 million at the box office. It received a mixed critical reception, with many praising the opening scene and performances, but criticism for its writing and lack of scares. It was followed by the 1993 made-for-cable sequel When a Stranger Calls Back and a remake in 2006.

The film has developed a large cult following over time because of the first 23 minutes, now consistently regarded as one of the scariest openings in film history. The first 13 minutes of Wes Craven's Scream (1996) pay homage to the opening of When a Stranger Calls.

Plot
Jill Johnson is babysitting the children of Dr. Mandrakis at his home. When the children are asleep, Jill receives a telephone call from a man who asks her if she has checked the children. Jill initially dismisses the call as a practical joke. However, he calls again and again, the calls increasing in frequency and threat level, and Jill becomes frightened. She calls the police, who tell her to keep the perpetrator on the line long enough for them to trace the call. Jill receives one final call from her harasser. Immediately after the conversation, the police phone to inform her that the calls are coming from a line located somewhere inside the house. Jill sees the intruder's shadow. Unbeknownst to her, an English merchant seaman named Curt Duncan killed the children shortly after Jill arrived. He leaves Jill unharmed and, after his trial, is sent to a psychiatric facility.

Seven years later, Duncan escapes from the psychiatric facility. Dr. Mandrakis hires John Clifford, who investigated the earlier murders but is now a private detective, to find Duncan. Not knowing Clifford is after him, the homeless Duncan is beaten after harassing a woman, Tracy, in a downtown bar. Duncan follows Tracy to her apartment and she takes pity on him. She tries to be nice to him while getting him to leave, hoping this will be the last she sees of him.

Meanwhile, an increasingly obsessed Clifford confides to his friend Lieutenant Garber his intention to kill Duncan rather than have him recommitted. Garber, who was also present at the Mandrakis crime scene, agrees to collaborate. Clifford tracks Duncan to Tracy's residence. He tells Tracy that Duncan literally tore the Mandrakis children apart with his bare hands and Tracy reluctantly agrees to act as bait at the bar that evening in an effort to draw Duncan out. Duncan never appears. After Clifford leaves, however, Duncan comes out of hiding from inside Tracy’s closet. Tracy screams for help and Clifford returns, chasing Duncan from the scene but losing his trail in the streets of downtown Los Angeles.

Jill is now married with two young children. One night, she and her husband Stephen go to dinner to celebrate his promotion while their children are babysat by Sharon. While at the restaurant, Jill gets a telephone call and hears Duncan's voice asking again: "Have you checked the children?" The police escort Jill back home to discover that everything there is fine.

Upon hearing about the incident, Garber alerts Clifford. Clifford tries to call Jill, but finds that the line is dead in an eerie parallel to Jill's original stalking. Later that night, Jill hears Duncan's voice as the closet door appears to open. She tries to awaken her husband only to realize that the man lying next to her is the intruder. He chases Jill across the room and attempts to kill her, but Clifford arrives in time to shoot Duncan in the chest, killing him. Stephen is found in the closet, unconscious but alive. Their children are safe.

Cast

Production

Development

When a Stranger Calls is an expanded remake of Fred Walton and Steve Feke's short film The Sitter (1977), which roughly comprised the first 23 minutes of this film. Walton and Fake alleged that they based The Sitter on a newspaper article detailing the harassment of a young woman who, while babysitting in Santa Monica, California, received phone calls from her attacker inside the residence.

The Sitter was released theatrically as a pre-screening short feature on a bill with Looking for Mr. Goodbar (1977). Executive producers Barry Krost and Douglas Chapin were so impressed by The Sitter that they acquired the rights and commissioned Walton and Feke to develop the short into a full-length feature.

Filming
The film marked cinematographer Donald Peterman's feature film debut as director of photography. Principal photography began October 9, 1978, and took place over 27 1/2 days at locations in and around Los Angeles, largely including the Brentwood neighborhood. The house which served as the location for the first act of the movie was at 321 S. Chadbourne Ave., in Brentwood. The Lockhart home in the final act was at 2722 Club Drive in Los Angeles. Both houses have since been torn down. In November 1978, filming occurred in downtown Los Angeles during the Skid Row stabbing murders, and, by coincidence, utilized some of the sites where actual murder victims had been discovered, including the steps of the Los Angeles Public Library.

The downtown bar where Duncan and Tracy meet was Torchy's at 218 W. Fifth Street in Los Angeles. This is the same bar that served as filming locations for the redneck bar in 48 Hrs. and for the 1985 version of Brewster's Millions. Filming was completed by mid-November 1978.

Release
Columbia Pictures released When a Stranger Calls theatrically in the United States on September 28, 1979. Following successful box office receipts, Columbia re-released it to theaters in the fall of 1980, with screenings beginning in early October in the San Francisco Bay Area and Detroit, and on Halloween night in Miami and the Raleigh metropolitan area.

Carol Kane stated in an interview that while watching the film in the theater the audience began screaming and talking back to the screen during the opening 23 minutes of the film. Tony Beckley, who played Curt Duncan, died in April 1980, six months after the film's premiere. The 1993 sequel When a Stranger Calls Back was dedicated to his memory.

Rating
The American Classification and Rating Administration (CARA) originally voted unanimously for a PG-rating (five years before the PG-13 rating was available for use). However, CARA chair Richard Heffner then viewed the film and called the board for discussion to consider voting for an R-rating instead. Although the theme of a film could potentially be accommodated within a PG-rating, Heffner argued that this film's treatment of its theme was too unsettling for most parents to want it to be freely available to unaccompanied children. A majority vote was then received to assign the film its R rating.

Box office
The film had a gross of $482,969 from pre-release engagements. It expanded to 468 theaters and grossed $2,597,032 in its opening four days. It placed second on Varietys weekly box office chart for the week ended October 3, 1979 and moved up to number one in its third week of release. It went on to gross $20,149,106 during its initial theatrical run in the United States and Canada. In its 1980 theatrical re-release the film managed to gross an additional $1,262,052. The film was a financial success, given its $1.5 million budget. Some contemporaneous newspaper sources note the film grossed approximately $25 million.

Critical reception
On Metacritic, which assigns a normalized rating to reviews, the film has a weighted average score of 58 out of 100, based on seven critics, indicating "mixed or average reviews".

Roger Ebert described the film as "sleazy" in a 1980 episode of Sneak Previews. In her review for The New York Times, Janet Maslin wrote "When a Stranger Calls is an energetic first film", adding that "the frightened-babysitter opening of the movie is marvelously modern, as Mr. Walton demonstrates that a haunted house with an ice-making refrigerator is intrinsically scarier than a house without one. He also makes the most of that fearsome modern weapon, the telephone." Author Travis Holt elaborates on the importance of the telephone to the film's portrayal of horror, noting that in the beginning "The phone is presented as a means of safety and comfort; it is a savior rather than a burden." Once the harassing phone calls begin, however, the view of the telephone becomes more sinister:

Critic Elston Brooks of the Fort Worth Star-Telegram felt the film was superior to its contemporary Halloween (1978), adding that director Walton "keeps his tension-level at a nearly unbearable mark in the film's first half...  He keeps it at a high dramatic level, thank to Durning and Beckley, in the second half, which is almost a second movie as far as plot goes."

Accolades
In January 1980, the film screened at the Avoriaz International Fantastic Film Festival in France, where it won the Prix de la Critique and the Prix Special du Jury awards, marking the first time a single film had won in both categories.

Home media
The film was released on VHS by Columbia Pictures Home Entertainment in 1981, and reissued in 1986.

A DVD release was distributed by Sony Pictures Home Entertainment on October 9, 2001, with the only supplements being bonus trailers. A Blu-ray version of the film was eventually released by Mill Creek Entertainment in a double feature with Happy Birthday to Me (1981) on March 26, 2013. Neither film contains any special features on the disc.

The film was eventually released as a stand-alone on Blu-ray on February 11, 2020 by Mill Creek Entertainment with packaging designed to look like a VHS.

In the United Kingdom, Second Sight announced a special edition Blu-ray, which was released on December 17, 2018. The Blu-ray includes a brand new scan and restoration, plus the sequel When a Stranger Calls Back, a new scan and restoration of the original short film The Sitter, a reversible sleeve with new artwork by Obviously Creative and original poster artwork, as well as interviews with director Fred Walton, Carol Kane, Rutanya Alda, composer Dana Kaproff, the "limited edition" original soundtrack CD, along with a 40-page perfect-bound booklet with a new essay by Kevin Lyons. A standard edition without the soundtrack and booklet was released by Second Sight on July 1, 2019.

See also
 List of films featuring home invasions

Notes

References

Sources

External links

 
 
 

1970s crime thriller films
1970s mystery thriller films
1970s psychological thriller films
1970s thriller films
1979 films
1979 horror films
1979 directorial debut films
1979 independent films
American crime thriller films
American detective films
American independent films
American mystery thriller films
American psychological thriller films
Columbia Pictures films
Features based on short films
Films about murderers
Films about stalking
Films based on urban legends
Films directed by Fred Walton (director)
Films shot in Los Angeles
Home invasions in film
Films about telephony
When a Stranger Calls (film series)
1970s English-language films
1970s American films